Steyning was a parliamentary borough in Sussex, England, which elected two Members of Parliament (MPs) to the House of Commons sporadically from 1298 and continuously from 1467 until 1832. It was a notorious rotten borough, and was abolished by the Great Reform Act.

History
The borough comprised the small market town of Steyning in Sussex, which consisted of little more than a single long street; yet despite its size it not only elected its own two MPs but contained most of the borough of Bramber, which had two of its own. (Between the 13th and 15th centuries, Bramber and Steyning were a single borough returning MPs to most Parliaments, sometimes called by one name and sometimes by the other, but after 1467 both were separately represented. Until 1792 it was theoretically possible for a house to confer on its occupier a vote in both boroughs.) In 1831, the population of the borough was just over 1,000, and the town contained 218 houses.

At the time of the Reform Act, the right to vote was exercised by the constable and all inhabitant householders paying scot and lot and not receiving alms; this was a liberal franchise for the period, though it amounted to only around 118 voters by the time the borough was abolished. The householders seem historically to have had the right to vote, but the question was the subject of litigation through most of the 18th century. Between 1715 and 1792, the right was instead restricted to occupiers of "ancient houses" and of houses built on the site of ancient houses, in effect a burgage franchise; but the restoration of the householders' rights does not seem to have increased the electorate substantially, suggesting that most of the houses significant enough for their tenants to be rated for scot and lot had the status of burgage tenements.

For most of the borough's existence, the majority of the qualified voters were tenants of one or two landowners, who therefore had considerable influence if not total control of the choice of MP. (Indeed, Steyning was cited by Thomas Oldfield, the contemporary historian of electoral abuses in the unreformed House of Commons, as an example of a borough where tenancies were granted for the sole purpose of ensuring that the electorate consisted of pliable voters.)

The state of the borough in the 18th century was described in a local agent's letter to the former prime minister, the Duke of Newcastle, in 1767:

"There are 102 in number who claim a right of voting, but not more than 90 whose claim will bear a scrutiny. Out of this number Sir John Honywood has 40 tenants who at present are all disposed to stand by him, and about six or seven others who are full as closely attached to him as any of his tenants. This gives him nearly or quite a majority of the 90 real votes. The rest are all a rope of sand and may be had by anybody."  - Letter of Thomas Steele to the Duke of Newcastle, 6 February 1767, quoted by Namier & Brooke

As the letter hints, Honywood's control was not quite absolute and he could not always secure both seats for his candidates. The 1792 ruling on the franchise, moving the vote from the burgage holders to all the householders paying scot and lot, shifted the balance of power over to the Duke of Norfolk (who owned most of the properties that were not classed as ancient houses), and he subsequently bought out Honywood's interest. But he was careful to secure his investment by financing many improvements in the town.

Steyning was abolished as a constituency by the Reform Act, being thereafter included in the borough of New Shoreham (which had earlier been expanded to include the whole of the Rape of Bramber as a remedy for corruption).

Members of Parliament

MPs 1467–1640

MPs 1640–1832

Notes

References 
Robert Beatson, A Chronological Register of Both Houses of Parliament (London: Longman, Hurst, Res & Orme, 1807) 
D Brunton & D H Pennington, Members of the Long Parliament (London: George Allen & Unwin, 1954)
Cobbett's Parliamentary history of England, from the Norman Conquest in 1066 to the year 1803 (London: Thomas Hansard, 1808) 
 Lewis Namier & John Brooke, The History of Parliament: The House of Commons 1754-1790 (London: HMSO, 1964)
 J. E. Neale, The Elizabethan House of Commons (London: Jonathan Cape, 1949)
 T. H. B. Oldfield, The Representative History of Great Britain and Ireland (London: Baldwin, Cradock & Joy, 1816)
 J Holladay Philbin, Parliamentary Representation 1832 - England and Wales (New Haven: Yale University Press, 1965)
 Edward Porritt and Annie G Porritt, The Unreformed House of Commons (Cambridge University Press, 1903)
Henry Stooks Smith, "The Parliaments of England from 1715 to 1847" (2nd edition, edited by FWS Craig - Chichester: Parliamentary Reference Publications, 1973)

Parliamentary constituencies in South East England (historic)
Constituencies of the Parliament of the United Kingdom established in 1467
Constituencies of the Parliament of the United Kingdom disestablished in 1832
Rotten boroughs
Steyning